Vohipeno is a town and commune in Madagascar. It belongs to the district of Fenerive Est, which is a part of Analanjirofo Region. The population of the commune was estimated to be approximately 36,000 in the 2001 commune census.

Primary and junior level secondary education are available in the town. The majority of the population of the commune are farmers, estimated to be about 98%.  The most important crop is cloves, while other important products are coffee and rice.  The service industry provides employment for 2% of the population.

References and notes 

Populated places in Analanjirofo